Mansoura is an abandoned village in UN Buffer Zone near Kokkina.

References

Communities in Nicosia District